These hits topped the Dutch Top 40 in 1986.

See also
1986 in music

References

1986 in the Netherlands
1986 record charts
1986